Lisac is a surname. Croatian 'lisac' means 'fox'. Notable people with the surname include:

 Gelu Lisac (born 1967), Romanian water polo player 
 Josip Lisac (born 1950), Croatian linguist and dialectologist
 Josipa Lisac (born 1950), Croatian singer

Croatian surnames